Sa'sa' was a Palestinian village, located 12 kilometres northwest of Safed that was depopulated by Israeli forces during the 1948 Arab-Israeli war. The village suffered two massacres committed by Haganah forces: one in mid-February 1948 and the other at the end of October the same year. Its place has been taken since 1949 by Sasa, an Israeli kibbutz.

History
Sa'sa' was built on the site of a Bronze Age (early second millennium B.C.) settlement whose remains (walls, tombs, cisterns, and olive and wine presses), have been unearthed. One village house had foundations which has been dated back to fourth century by archaeologists. Another excavated in 2003 yielded ceramics dated to the fourteenth–fifteenth centuries CE.

The Arab geographer Abū 'Ubayd 'Abd Allāh al-Bakrī (d.1094) reported that one passed through Sa'sa' when travelling from Dayr al-Qasi to Safad.

Ottoman era
In 1516 Sa'sa', with the rest of Palestine, came under the control of the Ottoman Empire. Shortly after, Sa'sa' was made a checkpoint where a toll was collected on various goods and travellers; the first records of such taxes are from 1525/6.

In 1596 Sa'sa' was classified as a village in the nahiya ("subdistrict") of Jira, part of liwa' ("district") of Safad, with a population of 457. It paid taxes on wheat, barley, olives and fruits, as well as on goats, beehives, and vineyards. According to this tax records, all the villagers were Muslim. In the eighteenth century Sa'sa' in mentioned as one of the fortified villages of Galilee controlled by Zahir al-Umar's son, Ali. After the defeat of Zahir al-Umar in 1775 Ali continued to resist the Ottoman authorities and defeated an army sent against him at Sa'sa'.

Excavations in 1972 on the west side of the hill revealed the remains of a large rectangular structure (15m x 41 m) with 2m thick walls made out of rubble stone with ashlar facing. At the south-west corner of the building there was a solid semi-circular tower (diameter 7m). The main part of the structure is a rectangular hall divided into two rows of five bays. There was a central row of four piers and two half-piers which would probably have supported a cross-vaulted roof. In a later phase an outer skin (2m wide) was added, making the wall a total of 4m thick. At the same time the round tower was converted into a square plan. According to the excavators, the place was occupied for a "fairly long" period, and suggest that it was probably part of the fortress built by Ali, (son of Zahir al-Umar) in the eighteenth century. The design of the building is quite compatible with other fortresses of the period, like Qalat Jiddin and Dayr Hanna.

In 1875, Victor Guérin found it to be a Muslim village  with about  350 inhabitants.

In 1881,  the PEF's Survey of Western Palestine (SWP)   described  Sa'sa' as a village with a population of 300, built on a slight hill that was surrounded by vineyards and olive and fig trees.

A population list from about 1887 showed  Sa'sa''' to have  about 1,740  inhabitants; all  Muslims.

Pottery vessels from the Rashaya al-Fukhar workshops, dating to the late Ottoman and early Mandate eras  have been found here.

British Mandate era
In the 1922 census of Palestine conducted by the British Mandate authorities,  Sa'sa''  had a population of 634; all Muslim,  increasing in the 1931 census to  840, still all  Muslims,  in  a total of 154 houses.

The village had a small market-place in the village center with a few shops, as well as a mosque and two elementary schools, one for girls and one for boys.

In  the 1944/45 statistics the village had a population of 1,130 Muslims and a total land area of 14,796 dunams.  Of this, 4,496 dunums were  used  for cereals; 1,404 dunums were irrigated or used for orchards, while 48 dunams were built-up (urban) area.

1948

In February 1948, Yigal Allon, commander of the Palmach in the north, ordered an attack on Sa'sa'. The order was given to Moshe Kelman, the deputy commander of Third Battalion. The order read: "You have to blow up twenty houses and kill as many warriors as possible". According to Pappé, the quote says which said "warriors"  should be read "villagers". Khalidi,  referencing  "The History of the Haganah" by Ben-Zion Dinur, say they referred to the massacre as "one of the most daring raids into enemy territory."

On February 15, 1948, a Palmach unit entered the village during the night and, without resistance, planted explosives against some of the houses. It was reported at the time that ten or more houses were totally or partially destroyed and 11 villagers were killed (5 of them small children).

Currently, there are few remains of the Palestinian village of Sa'sa', with the exception of the village mosque, which has now been converted into the kibbutz cultural center.

In 1992, the Palestinian historian Walid Khalidi described the remains of the village: "Some of the old olive trees remain, and a number of walls and houses still stand. Some of the houses are presently used by kibbutz Sasa; one of them has an arched entrance and arched windows. A large portion of the surrounding land is forested, the rest is cultivated by Israeli farmers."

See also 
Depopulated Palestinian locations in Israel

References

Bibliography

 Cited in Petersen, (2001)
 
 (p. 256)
 
Gibson, S and Braun, E. (1972) Sa'sa', HA, 63-64, pp 11–12 (in Hebrew). Cited in Petersen, 2002
 

 

 (Sa'sa' pp. 46, 95)
 

 
 (pp. 368-369)

External links 
Palestine Remembered - Sa'sa'
Sa'sa',  Zochrot
Survey of Western Palestine, map 4: IAA, Wikimedia commons
Sa'sa', the Khalil Sakakini Cultural Center
Sa3sa3, Dr. Moslih Kanaaneh
Sa’sa’, Dr. Khalil Rizk.

District of Safad
Arab villages depopulated during the 1948 Arab–Israeli War